The Ethiopian Evangelical Church Mekane Yesus (EECMY; also called Mekane Yesus Church) is a Lutheran denomination in Ethiopia. It is the largest member church of the Lutheran World Federation. It is a Lutheran denomination with some Pentecostal influence and one Presbyterian-leaning synod, with a large Pietistic following.

With the encouragement of the Lutheran and Presbyterian missionary societies in Ethiopia and the Lutheran World Federation, the Evangelical congregations in several parts of the country met on April 23 and 25, 1958 to deliberate on the draft constitution and establish the EECMY. From these joint efforts the church was instituted as a national church on January 21, 1959, taking its name from the first congregation in Addis Ababa, Mekane Yesus ("Place of Jesus"). EECMY has a motto of "Serving the Whole Person" that was developed in the 1970s. This "holistic ministry" theme has helped it to carry out its ministry in evangelism and development work. One of the leading theologians of the EECMY was Gudina Tumsa (1929–1979), who was general secretary for several years up until his arrest and murder at the hands of the communist government of Ethiopia in 1979.

The church, which was born out of Swedish missionary work amongst others, today through Mekane Yesus International Missionary Society itself has many missionaries in countries all around the world: South Asia, several African countries, the Middle East, and Guyana.

History 
The EECMY was founded on work begun by Northern European missionaries in the late 19th and early 20th centuries. These missionaries concentrated their work in southern Ethiopia, where the Orthodox Christian influence was less profound. The strategy of the missionaries and evangelists to implant a Protestant church in Ethiopia was one of development. At a time when Emperor Haile Selassie was looking to modernize and promote progress in the state, foreign and domestic missions were some of the most productive agents. In fact, Selassie wrote in his autobiography that he only “permitted missions because of their efforts in the field of education and health care”. It was through development that the Evangelical church was able to first establish a presence in the 19th and 20th centuries. In fact, as more people in power in the Orthodox Church began to question the validity of foreign missions in Ethiopian society, and as the identification of the Orthodox Church and the Amharic language as unifying forces within Ethiopia began to grow, many of the people who held high administrative positions owed their education to the mission schools, and were thus reluctant to pass any legislation against them. Thus, while many sociological and religious forces weighed against the Evangelical church and its missions in Ethiopia, the fact that it was effective as an agent of development aided its survival through its burgeoning years.

The Orthodox Church was still favored in the eyes of most as the true Ethiopian religion, as shown in the Imperial Decree on Missions in 1944, which stated that the missions could not engage in religious activities in “Ethiopian Church areas”; however, the decree allowed considerable freedom for missionaries, most of whom were still foreign. The EECMY church was beginning to gain some legitimacy in the eyes of at least a few, but was still seen as a spawn of foreign, colonial activity. This was made evident when the Mekane Yesus church became “legally registered” on February 13, 1969, even though it had been functioning as an independent entity since 1959. In assigning an official name to the Lutheran offshoot, semantics became a key point of contention. The patriarch of the EOC at the time was largely opposed to the word “Ethiopian” being attached to the church’s name, as he claimed it was nothing but an organization, “inspired and led from abroad”. He was also against it being officially registered as a church, claiming that it was merely an organization. After much debate however, the name was established as the “Evangelical Church Mekane Yesus in Ethiopia” (ECMY). It was changed to its current title “Ethiopian Evangelical Church Mekane Yesus (EECMY) in 1978. The Patriarch’s perspective represents the general sentiment among orthodox followers that the Mekane Yesus church was not truly a native church.

While the Orthodox Church had a long history in Ethiopia and had shaped much of the culture of the center, there were still large pockets of cultures unaffected by the church, especially in the peripheral regions where the EECMY experienced most of its growth, such as the south and the west. One of the prominent early Ethiopian evangelists, Onesimos Nesib, was crucial in this spread. He was active in his work in the spreading of the gospel to the marginal regions of the country that were both hard to reach and restricted by the government, and he also was the first person to translate the entire Protestant Bible into the language of the Oromo, the largest ethnic group in Ethiopia. This in itself was a huge step for the EECMY.

Because of Nesib's work, the ECMY was able to gain a large constituency outside the Orthodox centers, specifically among the Oromo. The Orthodox Church has always represented the greatest institutional obstacle for the growth of the EECMY, if not actively, then by its mere presence and dominance in the public sphere. The EECMY has seen opposition from Muslims as well. The particularly malicious bent taken towards Evangelical churches during the Derg's socialist revolution of the 1970s, which manifested itself in attacks on EECMY churches by means of arson, arrests, and forced closings, exemplified this place in society. Additionally, the labels of outsider, colonist, enemy, and stranger were all stigmas with which the EECMY lived in the decades leading up to the fighting. The persecution of the church was evident before the socialist revolution, and only increased during the war.

As a response to this, the church – now left largely to itself as many foreign missionaries were evacuated for safety’s sake – began to develop a rugged theology responding to its suffering, with phrases such as “God is with us” and “Hitherto the Lord has helped us” emphasized in the church’s conferences of the time. One of the EECMY pastors who emerged as a political and religious leader in this trying time was Gudina Tumsa, who has been called “the Dietrich Bonhoeffer of Africa” in the years following his martyrdom in 1979. In 2000, Rev. Bekure Daba was received as the Church's first ordained woman.

The Reformed section of the denomination was founded by the United Presbyterian Church in 1869. Dr. Thomas Lambie, a missionary of the United Presbyterian Church, begun work in the western part of the country. During the Italian occupation, missionaries were forced to leave, but the Bethel Evangelical Church was founded with native believers. It became an independent church in 1947. After World War II, BEC experienced rapid growth. In 1974 it became part of the EECMY, and now it has more than 1,000 000 members. Former BEC presbyteries and synods retain their names. In the western Synod of Gambela, more than 60% of the population are members of the Bethel Evangelical Church.

Theology

Gudina Tumsa, Emmanuel Abraham, and Holistic Theology 
Gudina Tumsa is in many regards the father of the indigenous theological thought of the EECMY, and especially its Holistic Theology. In fact, a study of his theology and the theology of Emmanuel Abraham (a colleague, contemporary, and friend) comprises a large portion of the EECMY theology. Tumsa studied theology in the United States, and because of this gained a relatively broad understanding of mission and the church. Upon returning to Ethiopia, he "gave his church a decisive push towards independence in theological thought and church practice", criticizing many aspects of Western Christianity. Much of his theology is contained in the letters he wrote to church leaders and the general public, as well as in the addresses he gave at various conferences around the world in the 1960s and 1970s.

The main points of his theology center on a holistic hermeneutic that not only encompasses a broad ontology, but which also applies itself to both the life in this world and in the next. His theology can be portrayed as a type of liberation theology, but cannot be categorized strictly in this class; indeed, it contains a uniquely Ethiopian flavor, “a theology of liberation in the Ethiopian context”, as Tasgara Hirpo describes it. Tumsa describes his own theology as a “holistic theology”, writing in a memo to Abraham that “western theology has lost the this-worldly dimension of human existence”; according to him, his holistic theology is merely “an effort in rediscovering total human life” in all its width and breadth. It does not allow the suffering of this world to eclipse the joy of the next – the physical reality to overtake the spiritual – but instead he says that both are in need of redemption, salvation, and liberation.

In this regard, Abraham and Tumsa differ in their approach to state involvement. For several years, Abraham held a position in the government that allowed him significant sway within political circles, all the while remaining faithful to the EECMY, of which he was president for 22 years. He tended toward unity with the central powers rather than ‘rocking the boat,’ even though he saw his people suffering oppression. Tumsa was more willing to part with the central powers in favor of the oppressed people of his church, as evidenced by his omission of Emperor Haile Selassie’s name from the normal intercessions in the Sunday liturgy in the months leading up to the socialist revolution in response to the feudal system that Tumsa saw as an instrument of oppression.

Yet, however divergent their perspectives on church-state relations may appear, there was unity in that they both supported the creation of quasi-public institutions of education, health, and vocational training that the government not only supported, but also maintained when the network of institutions outgrew the administrative capability of the EECMY. They were both dedicated to a church that worked in conjunction with the state for the development of better lives for their countrymen; where they differed was the measure of allegiance they meted out to the government or to the people. Either way, the EECMY took seriously their commission to carry their message into the world.

Ecumenism and Western theological criticism 
Tumsa emerged as the leader of the movement to develop a characteristically Ethiopian theology and to share it for the edification not only of the nation, but also of other Christians abroad. He described the goal of the EECMY in relation to its global sister churches as “self-reliance” and “interdependence”. “Independence is a legitimate political aim; it can never be an acceptable theological aim for the church,” Tumsa said in a debate. His life showcased this in that, even as he urged the church to gain an independent theology based on the Ethiopian experience, he was also constantly in conversation with brothers and sisters in other nations, engaging in several multinational theological conferences.

In reference to Western theology, Gudina was both familiar and critical, having been trained at Luther Seminary in Minnesota, which gave him a solid foundation for theologizing in Ethiopia. In contrast to the Holistic Theology that characterized both his perspective and that of the EECMY, Tumsa perceived that there was too great a disconnect between Western theology and ethics, and was said to have promoted a praxis-reflection-praxis ethical model. He thought this provided an interesting alternative to the prevalent church-state separation that he believed characterized the American church. Tumsa wanted Western Christians to reexamine their actions in light of a Holistic theological framework. He urged them to reevaluate their ethical consciousness in light of national and global societal problems.

Finally, Tumsa's perspective on ecumenism theology is brought to light in Tumsa's and Abraham’s 1972 report “On the Interrelation between Proclamation of the Gospel and Human Development.” Among other arguments, they discussed the “simply frightening” reality arising as a result of the rapid growth and “phenomenal expansion” of the Christian Church across Africa in the last few decades. They asserted that not only will this result in an immense shortage of “physical plant” (e.g. church buildings, religious education, literacy programs, etc.) in countries such as Ethiopia who are struggling with so much growth, but it also establishes the “‘center of gravity’ in the Christian world” firmly on the African continent. This puts immense theological responsibility on the “historically young churches” of the world, which are not only dealing with a lack of theological experience and history, but will also have to manage a shortage of resources available to solve these mounting difficulties.

Membership 
EECMY claimed almost 2.3 million members in 2007, growing to 8.3 million baptized members according to the 2016 statistics. They operate a seminary in Addis Ababa with 150 students. The church also owns several bible colleges, schools, and health care and social facilities in various locations throughout the country. In Addis Ababa they also run a language and cultural orientation school, called MY-LINC, for people who want to learn Ethiopian languages. Most congregations speak local languages, but the International Lutheran Church (Ethiopia) is English-speaking.

Relations with other churches 
The EECMY approved the establishment of a full communion relationship with the North American Lutheran Church at their convocation in August 2011. The EECMY decided to end its partnership with the Evangelical Lutheran Church in America and the Church of Sweden, because of their acceptance of same-sex unions and non-celibate homosexual clergy, after a resolution that was approved at the 19th General Assembly in Addis Ababa, on February 11, 2013. The EECMY has also established relationships with the Lutheran Church–Missouri Synod and the Reformed Church in America, both from the United States.

The EECMY is a member of the Global Confessional and Missional Lutheran Forum, the Lutheran World Federation, the World Council of Churches, the All Africa Conference of Churches, the Lutheran Communion in Central and Eastern Africa, and the World Communion of Reformed Churches.

The EECMY, because of its development work, is a member of ACT Development, a global alliance of churches and related agencies committed to working together on development. EECMY is a participant in the Wycliffe Global Alliance and it is a member of the Fellowship of Christian Councils and Churches in the Great Lakes and Horn of Africa.

As a member of the Evangelical Church Fellowship of Ethiopia, the Ethiopian Evangelical Church Mekane Yesus is in communion or cooperation with the Ethiopian Kale Heywet Church (a Baptist denomination), the Ethiopian Full Gospel Believers' Church (a Pentecostal denomination), and the Meserete Kristos Church (a Mennonite-affiliated denomination).

See also 
 P'ent'ay
List of the largest Protestant bodies

References

External links

Belay: LCMS 'not there for lip service' for Ethiopian seminary 
Africa Lutheran Communion, news from Ethiopia and Africa
Preachwongel

All Africa Conference of Churches
Lutheran denominations established in the 20th century
Lutheran World Federation members
Global Confessional and Missional Lutheran Forum members
Lutheranism in Ethiopia
Members of the World Communion of Reformed Churches
Members of the World Council of Churches
Christian organizations established in 1959
Radical Pietism